is a Japanese businesswoman and singer. She is the creative director of the fashion brand "Blixzy". She is a former member of Flower and E-girls.

Biography
She went to the Exile Professional Gym (EXPG) in Tokyo.

In 2011, she passed the vocal division of "Vocal Battle Audition 3" and joined Flower and E-girls.

On 12 October 2014 she announced to withdraw from Flower and E-girls to study abroad. On 26 October, with the Exile Tribe live performed at Kyocera Dome Osaka, she withdrew from E-girls. On 13 November, she later withdrew from Flower with a commemorative event of the single "Akikaze no Answer" at Ikebukuro Sunshine City.

On 16 February 2015, she announced the establishment of her own fashion brand "Blixzy". She is a creative director and performs total production including brand designing, modelling, and promoting.

On 16 August 2017, her solo single "Nobody Like You" became her first solo work sold at a Blixzy Harajuku store. Although she made her singing activity for the first time in about three years, she told on her blog that there was no intention to become active afterwards.

Discography

Singles (indies)

Filmography

Films

References

External links
 (February 2017 – ) 
 – Ameba Blog (December 2014 – February 2017) 

 Blixzy
 

1995 births
Living people
Japanese women pop singers
Japanese businesspeople
Singers from Tokyo
21st-century Japanese singers
21st-century Japanese women singers